Kelly Marie Parry is a Scottish politician serving as the leader of the Midlothian Council since 2022. A member of the Scottish National Party (SNP), she has been a councillor, representing the Midlothian West ward since 2015.

Early life 
Parry attended St David's High School in Dalkeith. She studied HND Business and HNC Social Science at Jewel and Esk College (know part of the Edinburgh College) from 2007 to 2009, before studying Social Policy and Criminology at the Open University from 2012 to 2016. 

Parry worked as a branch manager at the Post Office. She was a President of the Edinburgh College Students' Association and later was a Student Funding Policy Officer. Parry worked as a Funding Policy Officer for the Scottish Funding Council for Further and Higher Education.

Political career 
Following the 2014 Scottish independence referendum campaign, Parry was motivated to get into local politics. After Owen Thompson stood down from Midlothian Council following his election to the British House of Commons in the 2015 general election, a by-election for the Midlothian ward was held. Parry was successfully elected to succeed Thompson after securing 43.2% of first preference votes. 

She has been the Community Wellbeing Spokesperson for the Convention of Scottish Local Authorities (COSLA) since June 2017.

Parry led the SNP's national campaign in the 2022 Scottish local elections. On 7 May 2022, she was appointed SNP Group Leader in Midlothian Council, succeeding Colin Cassidy, who was appointed Deputy SNP Group Leader. 

On 24 May 2022, the SNP group announced that it had secured support to run a minority administration in Midlothian. Parry was elected leader of the council with Debbi McCall serving as provost.

Personal life 
Parry is a mother of two.

References 

People from Midlothian
Councillors in Scotland
Scottish people
21st-century Scottish women
Scottish women in politics
21st-century British women politicians
Living people
Scottish National Party councillors
Leaders of local authorities of Scotland